Robert Liefmann (4 February 1874 – 21 March 1941) was a German economist.

He was a professor at Freiburg University.

Literary works 

Kartell, 1905
Beteiligungs- und Finanzierungsgeselschaften, 1909
"Geld und Gold", 1916
Grundsätze der Volkswirtschaftslehre, 2 Vols., 1917-1919
"Die Geldvermehrung im Weltkriege und die Beseitigung ihrer Folgen : eine Untersuchung zu den Problemen der Übergangswirtschaft",1918

German economists
1874 births
1941 deaths